Felipe Herrero Baeza (born 18 June 1970), is a retired Spanish footballer who played as a defender.

Career statistics

Club

Notes

References

External links

1970 births
Living people
Footballers from Madrid
Spanish footballers
Association football defenders
La Liga players
Segunda División players
Segunda División B players
Real Madrid Castilla footballers
CD Castellón footballers
Córdoba CF players
CD Logroñés footballers
CD Toledo players
CD Ourense footballers
AD Alcorcón footballers
Spain youth international footballers
Spain under-21 international footballers